Furth bei Göttweig is a town and municipality in the district of Krems-Land in the Austrian state of Lower Austria. The municipality consists of the following populated places:

Aigen
Furth bei Göttweig
Klein-Wien
Oberfucha
Palt
Steinaweg
Stift Göttweig.

Population

Twin towns
Furth bei Göttweig is twinned with:

  Domažlice, Czech Republic
  Furth im Wald, Germany
  Ludres, France

References

Cities and towns in Krems-Land District